A Celtic Requiem (Requiem for Jenny Jones) is a requiem by the English composer John Tavener, written in 1969. It is written for soprano, children's choir and orchestra.

Despite its title, the work is not actually a requiem for anyone in particular. Instead, it takes the rough format of a singing game for children. A character, Jenny Jones, is selected by the children who at one point dance around her to ward off evil spirits. According to the composer, this though handed down to children, has its origin in a funeral rite in the lowlands of Scotland. The piece is composed in three sections which follow the traditional requiem: 'Requiem aeternam', 'Dies irae' and 'Requiescat in pace'.

It was premiered by the London Sinfonietta and chorus under David Atherton in August 1969. Shortly afterward the BBC recorded it with the soprano June Barton and the children of Little Missenden Village School and the composer playing the organ. These forces then recorded the work for Apple Records along with two other Tavener pieces: Nomine Jesu and Coplas. The recording was released in 1970, and re-released as a CD (on SAPCOR 20) in 1993.

References

Requiems
Apple Records albums
Compositions by John Tavener
John Tavener albums
1969 compositions